Christianity Unveiled, or examination of the principles and effects of the Christian religion is a book that criticizes Christianity attributed to Baron d'Holbach, probably published in 1766.

In his religious criticism, Holbach focuses on aspects of the Christian faith which he considers inconsistent, and is particularly critical of the moral and political influence of the Christian religion. The findings of the book are numerous correspondences in Holbach's later works, however, contain only latent atheistic utterances and are mainly focused at Christianity than to religion in general.

Unlike previous publications critical of religion, the book has no analysis of the historical origins of religions or the project of a deistic religion alternative to the content, but is seen as an outspoken anti-Christian propaganda piece. The book sparked in philosophical and enlightened circles and the lively reaction it received caused it to be seized immediately after its release by the French authorities.

References

External links 
Christianity Unveiled
Read on Google books

Criticism of Christianity
French books